Pont Street Dutch is a term coined by Osbert Lancaster to describe  an architectural style typified by the large  red brick gabled houses built in the 1880s in Pont Street in Knightsbridge in London. Pevsner writes of the style as "tall sparingly decorated red brick mansions for very wealthy occupants, in the semi-Dutch, semi–Queen Anne manner of Shaw or George & Peto".

References 

Architectural styles
British architectural styles